Siebenstein is a play by the German writer Maxim Ziese. It is a First World War drama. It appeared at the Deutsches Theater in Berlin from March 1933 with Jürgen Fehling directing and a cast that included Veit Harlan, Lothar Müthel and Hilde Körber. Staged just as the Nazi Party was taking power in Germany, it is a work of transition that is nationalistic and pro-military rather than explicitly Nazi. It was followed afterwards at the theatre by a more overtly Nazi work Schlageter by Hanns Johst.

References

Bibliography
 Hostetter, Elisabeth Schulz. The Berlin State Theater Under the Nazi Regime: A Study of the Administration, Key Productions, and Critical Responses from 1933-1944. Edwin Mellen Press, 2004.
 Noack, Frank. Veit Harlan: The Life and Work of a Nazi Filmmaker. University Press of Kentucky, 2016.

1933 plays
German plays
Plays about World War I